Bitter Bread (Greek: Pikro psomi) is a 1951 Greek drama film directed by Grigoris Grigoriou and starring Eleni Zafeiriou, Inta Hristinaki and Michalis Nikolopoulos.

Cast
 Eleni Zafeiriou as Mrs. Lyberi  
 Inta Hristinaki as Louiza  
 Michalis Nikolopoulos as Thanasis Lyberis  
 Alkis Papas as Antonis Lyberis  
 Stratis Floros as Giangos Lyberis  
 Nikos Pantelidis as Arhontas  
 Alekos Kouris as Fotakis Lyberis  
 Dimos Starenios as Employer  
 Giorgos Nezos 
 Pantelis Zervos as Foreman  
 Sofia Arseni 
 Kimon Spathopoulos 
 Giorgos Mesalas 
 Andreas Lohaitis 
 Manos Faratzian 
 Evgenios Spatharis as Shadow Theatre Artist (voice) 
 Giorgos Foundas as Giangos Lyberis 
 Yiorgos Stavrakakis

References

Bibliography
 Vrasidas Karalis. A History of Greek Cinema. A&C Black, 2012.

External links
 

1951 films
1951 drama films
1950s Greek-language films
Greek drama films
Films directed by Grigoris Grigoriou
Greek black-and-white films